Entebbe Football Club, or short Entebbe FC, is a Ugandan football club from Entebbe.

They play in the second division of Ugandan football, the FUFA Big League.

The clubs plays in yellow and black kits.

Stadium
The team plays at the 1,200 capacity Uganda Fisheries Stadium.

References

External links
Soccerway
https://archive.today/20131121001240/http://lon01.supersport.com/football/uganda/news/121103/Entebbe_Young_shoot_down_Police

Football clubs in Uganda
Entebbe